The 50 kilometre race walk was an Olympic athletics event that first appeared in 1932 and made its final Olympic appearance in 2021. The racewalking event is competed as a road race. Athletes must always keep in contact with the ground and the supporting leg must remain straight until the raised leg passes it. 

50 kilometres is approximately 31 miles. 

The 50 kilometres race walk was dropped from the Olympic program after the 2020 Tokyo Games in 2021 and will be replaced by a mixed team race in order to achieve gender equality.

World records

The men's world record for the 50 km race walk was held by Denis Nizhegorodov, through his race of 3:34:14 in Cheboksary in 2008, until it was beaten by Yohann Diniz at the 2014 European Athletics Championships in Zurich, in a time of 3:32:33.

All-time top 25

Men
Correct as of December 2021.

Notes
Below is a list of other times equal or superior to 3:38:17:

Yohann Diniz also walked 3:33:12 (2017), 3:37:43 (2019), 3:37:48 (2016).
Denis Nizhegorodov also walked 3:35:29 (2004), 3:38:02 (2006).
Matej Tóth also walked 3:36:21 (2014).
Robert Korzeniowski also walked 3:36:39 (2002).
Alex Schwazer also walked 3:37:04 (2008), 3:37:09 (2008).
Robert Heffernan also walked 3:37:56 (2013).

Women
Correct as of June 2021.

Notes
Below is a list of other times equal or superior to 4:15:46:
Margarita Nikiforova also walked 4:03:07 (2021).
Inês Henriques also walked 4:08:26 (2017), 4:09:21 (2018), 4:13:57 (2019).
Yin Hang also walked 4:09:09 (2018).
Claire Tallent also walked 4:12:44 (2019).
Júlia Takács also walked 4:13:04 (2018), 4:15:22 (2018).
Ma Faying also walked 4:13:28 (2018).
Johana Ordóñez also walked 4:14:28 (2018).
Monica Svensson also walked 4:14:38 (2009).
Klavdiya Afanasyeva also walked 4:14:46 (2018).
Li Maocuo also walked 4:14:47 (2018).
Mirna Ortíz also walked 4:15:21 (2019).

Olympic medalists

Men’s

World Championships medalists

Men’s

Women’s

Notes

References

External links
50 kilometres race walk all time – men from IAAF
IAAF list of 50-kilometres-race-walk records in XML

Racewalking distances
Summer Olympic disciplines in athletics